The North Dakota Pipeline Company (NDPL) system is a 950-mile (1530 km) crude oil pipeline system that collects oil from fields in the Williston Basin in Montana and North Dakota and transports it eastward to other pipeline systems that carry oil to refineries in the Midwest.

In addition to collecting oil from wells in the United States, it also connects to a Canadian pipeline system owned by Enbridge at North Dakota's border with Saskatchewan.  The American pipeline is owned by Enbridge Energy Partners, LP, an organization partly owned by the Canadian company.

The pipeline's eastern terminus is in Clearbrook, Minnesota where there is a junction with Enbridge's Lakehead System and the Minnesota Pipeline (ultimately owned by Koch Industries).

System lines

NDPC system
Line 81
Line 82
Line 83
Line 84
Line 85
Line 85A
Line 86
Line 87
Line 88
Sandpiper pipeline (proposed)

Interconnect system
Line 26

References

External links
Enbridge Energy Partners liquid pipeline map for North Dakota Pipeline Company, LLC
Enbridge Energy Partners, L.P. Publicly Traded Partnerships Coalition

Energy infrastructure completed in 2008
Oil pipelines in Minnesota
Pipelines in Montana
Oil pipelines in North Dakota
Energy infrastructure in North Dakota
Energy infrastructure in Minnesota
Energy infrastructure in Montana
Crude oil pipelines in the United States